Bald Knoll, also called Black Knoll, Buck Knoll or Corral Knoll, is a cinder cone in Utah, in the Southwestern United States.

It is the youngest volcano at the southwest portion of the Paunsaugunt Plateau and it consists of basaltic lava with a well-preserved volcanic crater at its summit.

References

Volcanoes of Utah
Cinder cones of the United States
Basin and Range Province
Landforms of Kane County, Utah